Siegele is a surname. Notable people with the surname include:

Greg Siegele, Australian video game developer
Johann Siegele (born 1948), Austrian racewalker
Josef Siegele, Austrian politician
Wilfried Siegele (born 1958), Austrian racewalker

See also
Leonore Siegele-Wenschkewitz (1944–1999), German historian